Renato Gotti (born 26 July 1964) is a former Italian male long-distance runner who competed at three editions of the IAAF World Cross Country Championships at senior level (1992, 1993, 1994). He won two national championships at senior level (5000 metres: 1992, 1994).

Achievements

References

External links
 

1964 births
Living people
Italian male long-distance runners
Italian male mountain runners
Italian male cross country runners
20th-century Italian people